The 37th District of the Iowa House of Representatives in the state of Iowa.

Current elected officials
Mike Bousselot is the representative currently representing the district until 2021.

Past representatives
The district has previously been represented by:
 Bill Hansen, 1971–1973
 Chuck Grassley, 1973–1975
 Raymond Lageschulte, 1975–1983
 Victor Stueland, 1983–1991
 Robert Johnson, 1991–1993
 Mark A. Henderson, 1993–1995
 Clyde Bradley, 1995–2003
 Jeff Elgin, 2003–2007
 Art Staed, 2007–2009
 Renee Schulte, 2009–2013
 John Landon, 2013–2021
 Mike Bousselot, 2021-present

References

037